The 1917 Chesterton by-election was a parliamentary by-election held on 27 July 1917 for the House of Commons constituency of Chesterton also known as the Western Division of Cambridgeshire.

Vacancy
The by-election was caused by the appointment of the sitting Liberal MP, the Rt. Hon. Edwin Montagu as Secretary of State for India.  Under the Parliamentary rules of the day he had to resign and fight a by-election.

Candidates
Montagu was re-selected to fight the seat by his local Liberal Association and as the wartime truce between the political parties was in operation no opposing candidate was nominated against him.

The result
There being no other candidates putting themselves forward Montagu was returned unopposed.

References

See also
List of United Kingdom by-elections 
United Kingdom by-election records
1916 Chesterton by-election
1915 Chesterton by-election

1917 elections in the United Kingdom
1917 in England
20th century in Cambridgeshire
July 1917 events
By-elections to the Parliament of the United Kingdom in Cambridgeshire constituencies
Unopposed ministerial by-elections to the Parliament of the United Kingdom in English constituencies